Stawamus is a lake in the North Shore Mountains of British Columbia, Canada, which forms the head of the Stawamus River.

See also
List of rivers of British Columbia

References

Lakes of British Columbia
North Shore Mountains
Sea-to-Sky Corridor